Janet Lynn Lauritsen is an American criminologist and the Curators’ Distinguished Professor of Criminology and Criminal Justice at the University of Missouri–St. Louis.

Education and career
Dr. Lauritsen received her B.A. (1982), M.A. (1984), and Ph.D. in sociology (1989) from the University of Illinois at Urbana-Champaign. After serving as a postdoctoral research associate at the University of Illinois (1989–1990), she joined the Department of Criminology & Criminal Justice at the University of Missouri-St. Louis as an Assistant Professor in 1990. She was promoted to Associate Professor with tenure in 1996 as well as to full Professor in 2002. In 2013, Dr. Lauritsen was named a Curators’ Distinguished Professor – the 13th in the university's history – in the nationally ranked Department of Criminology & Criminal Justice.

Lauritsen served as Executive Counselor of the American Society of Criminology from 2004 to 2007. At present, she is the Co-Editor of the journal Criminology (2016–Present) as well as serves on the editorial board of the Journal of Quantitative Criminology (1994–2016).

Research
Dr. Lauritsen's research focuses on the causes and consequences of victimization, the social and historical contexts of crime and victimization, and quantitative research methodologies. Her current research analyzes how correlates of violent victimization such as gender, race and ethnicity, and poverty status have changed in the US over the past four decades. Recent publications cover topics on crime data and trends, gender inequality and violence against women, and the relationship between changing economic conditions and violent victimization.

Honors and awards
Over her professional tenure, Dr. Lauritsen has received a number of prestigious awards and fellowships. As a doctoral student (1985), she her work was recognized with Second Place in the Gene Carte Student Paper Competition Award, American Society of Criminology. As a university faculty member, she was the recipient of the 2002 Governor's Award for Excellence in Teaching – State of Missouri, University of Missouri System, as well as the 2012 Chancellor's Award for Excellence in Research (2012), UMSL. In 2010, Lauritsen received the Claude S. Fischer Award for Excellence in Contexts for a book review she co-authored with her UMSL colleague Richard Rosenfeld.

Lauritsen has thrice been named a Bureau of Justice Statistics Visiting Research Fellow (i.e., 2002–2004, 2005–2006, and 2011–2014) as well as a National Associate of the National Research Council (NRC) (2011), National Academy of Sciences – where she most recently served as Chair (2014-2018) of the NRC's Committee on National Statistics Panel on Modernizing the Nation’s Crime Statistics

In recognition of her distinctive scholarly contribution to the discipline of criminology, Dr. Lauritsen was named a Fellow of the American Society of Criminology in 2013.

References

External links
Faculty page

University of Missouri–St. Louis faculty
American criminologists
Living people
University of Illinois Urbana-Champaign alumni
American women social scientists
American women criminologists
Year of birth missing (living people)
21st-century American women